Fairbrother is a surname. Notable people with the surname include:

 Barrie Fairbrother, (born 1950), a retired English football player
 Helen Fairbrother, an English winner of the Miss International crown
 Ian Fairbrother (born 1966), a retired English football player
 John Fairbrother, English footballer
 Jack Fairbrother (1917–1999), an English professional football  goalkeeper
 Keith Fairbrother (born 1944), a former English chairman and rugby union  player of Coventry RFC
 Nan Fairbrother (1913–1971), an English writer and lecturer on landscape and land use
 Neil Fairbrother (born 1963), a former English cricket player
 Nicola Fairbrother (born 1970), a retired judo ka from England
 Russell Fairbrother, a lawyer and former New Zealand politician
 Sarah Fairbrother (1816–1890), an English actress and the mistress of Prince George, Duke of Cambridge
 Tim Fairbrother (born 1982), New Zealand rugby union player
 Tony Fairbrother (1926–2004), aeronautical engineer, flight test engineering on the maiden flight of the de Havilland Comet, the first jet airliner
 Trevor Fairbrother, (born 1951), curator, art historian (John Singer Sargent)
 Acen Fairbrother (1994--Still kickin), New Zealand DJ/Music Producer "Fairbrother"

See also 
 Fairbrothers